"T.L.C. A.S.A.P." is a song written by Gary Baker and Frank J. Myers, and recorded by American country music group Alabama.  It was released in December 1993 as the second single from their album Cheap Seats.  The song reached number 7 on the Billboard Hot Country Singles & Tracks chart in March 1994.

Chart performance

Year-end charts

References

1993 singles
1993 songs
Alabama (American band) songs
Songs written by Frank J. Myers
Songs written by Gary Baker (songwriter)
Song recordings produced by Josh Leo
RCA Records singles